James F. Brooks is an American historian whose work on slavery, captivity and kinship in the Southwest Borderlands was honored with major national history awards: the Bancroft Prize, Francis Parkman Prize, the Frederick Jackson Turner Award and the Frederick Douglass Prize (second prize).  He is the Gable Professor of Early American History at the University of Georgia, and Research Professor Emeritus of History and Anthropology at the University of California, Santa Barbara, where he serves as senior contributing editor of  the journal The Public Historian

Early life and education
Brooks graduated from University of California Davis, with a Ph.D. in history. Before pursuing his career in the academy, Brooks worked for a decade in the publishing and advertising industry in Colorado.

Career
An interdisciplinary scholar of the indigenous and colonial past, Brooks has held professorial appointments at the University of Maryland, UC Santa Barbara, and UC Berkeley, and the University of Georgia, as well as fellowships at the Institute for Advanced Study in Princeton and the Robert Penn Warren Center for the Humanities at Vanderbilt University.

Brooks was a Resident Scholar at the School for Advanced Research in Santa Fe, New Mexico from 2000–2001, and later joined the staff as Editor of SAR Press. In August 2005, Brooks became President and CEO of the School.

His books and articles have received more than a dozen national awards for scholarly excellence. His 2002 monograph Captives & Cousins: Slavery, Kinship and Community in the Southwest Borderlands focused on the traffic in women and children across the region as expressions of intercultural violence and accommodation. He extends these questions most recently through an essay on the eighteenth and nineteenth century Pampas borderlands of Argentina in his co-edited advanced seminar volume, Small Worlds: Method, Meaning, and Narrative in Microhistory from SAR Press. His 2016 book, MESA OF SORROWS: A HISTORY OF THE AWAT'OVI MASSACRE (WW Norton) earned the Caughey Prize for the most distinguished book on the history of the American West, and the Erminie Wheller-Voegelin Award for the best work of Ethnohistory from the American Society for Ethnohistory

David Brion Davis commented when making the Frederick Douglass Prize second prize for Captives and Cousins: Slavery, Kinship, and Community in the Southwest Borderlands:
"Until James F. Brooks, virtually all historians of American slavery have ignored the Spanish Southwest—the region acquired by the U.S. in 1848, as a result of the Mexican War. Brooks portrays and analyzes forms of slavery and captivity among the Indians and Spanish that differed markedly from the Anglo-American bondage to the east."

Works
 

 Mesa of Sorrows: A History of the Awat'ovi Massacre Awat'ovi Pueblo (WW Norton 2016).

Awards
The following awards were all for Captives and Cousins (2002)
 2003 Bancroft Prize
 2003 Francis Parkman Prize
 2003 Frederick Jackson Turner Award
 2003 Frederick Douglass Prize second prize 
 2003  Erminie Wheeler Voegelin Prize, American Society for Ethnohistory
Awards for Mesa of Sorrows 
2016 Caughey Western History Prize, Western Historical Association
2016 Erminie Wheeler Voegelin Prize, American Society for Ethnohistory

References

External links

"Book Review: Canada and the United States", The American Historical Review, February 2003

21st-century American historians
21st-century American male writers
University of California, Davis alumni
Living people
1955 births
Bancroft Prize winners
American male non-fiction writers